

Archosauromorphs

Newly named dinosaurs
Data courtesy of George Olshevsky's dinosaur genera list.

Other archosauromorphs

Synapsids

Non-mammalian

Other reptiles

References